Under the Sun is the 16th studio album by Japanese singer-songwriter Yōsui Inoue, released in September 1993.

Two songs "Gogatsu no Wakare" and "Make-Up Shadow" were released as a single prior to the album, and the latter became a massive hit.

"Make-Up Shadow" was featured as the theme song for Subarashikikana Jinsei, a television drama aired on Fuji TV. The music was composed by Jun Sato (who used the pseudonym Utsuru Ayame), and Inoue wrote the lyrics. The song became the highest-charting single for Inoue, reaching number-two on the Japanese Oricon Weekly Singles charts, selling in excess of 800,000 copies. Sato also arranged the song, and his arrangement won him a prize at the 35th Japan Record Awards.

The album debuted at the number-one on the Japanese Oricon, and became his fifth chart-topping non-compilation album since 9.5 Carats released in 1984.

Track listing
All songs written and composed by Yosui Inoue (except where indicated)
"Be-Pop Juggler" - 3:10
"Eleven" - 4:43
"" - 4:37
"Power Down" - 4:42
"Make-up Shadow" (Utsuru Ayame/Inoue) - 4:07
"" (Kyouhei Tsutsumi/Inoue) - 5:34
"" (Inoue/Natsumi Hirai) - 4:28
"" (Inoue/Jun Satō/Yasushi Akimoto) - 5:50
"" - 5:06
"Under the Sun" - 5:41
"" (Inoue/Banana-UG-Kawashima) - 4:06

Personnel
Yosui Inoue - Lead and background vocals, acoustic guitar
Jun Sato - Piano, electric piano, keyboards, synthesizer, acoustic guitar, percussion, background vocals
Banana-UG-Kawashima - Synthesizer, piano
Yoshinobu Kojima - Organ, piano
Yasuharu Nakanishi - Piano
Yasuhiro Kobayashi - Accordion
Tsuyoshi Kon - Acoustic guitar, electric guitar, bass guitar
Susumu Osada - Electric guitar
Haruo Kubota - Electric guitar
Koki Ito - Bass guitar
Chiharu Mikuzuki - Bass guitar
Hiroshi Igarashi - Auto harp, banjo, steel drums
Motoya Hamaguchi - Percussion, kalimba
Nobu Saito - Percussion
Hideo Yamaki - Drums
Jun Aoyama - Drums
Shin Kazuhara - Trumpet
Jake H. Conception - Saxophone
Taro Kiyooka - Trombone
Hidefumi Toki - Clarinet
Aska Strings (conducted by Aska Kaneko) - Strings
Ma*To - Computer programming
Keishi Urata - Computer programming
Hideki Matsutake - Computer programming
Naoki "Taro" Suzuki - Drums programming
Seri - Background vocals
Nisa - Background vocals
Anna - Background vocals
Eve - Background vocals

Production
Arranger: Yosui Inoue (#1,4), Jun Sato (#5,6,8,9), Tsuyoshi Kon (#2), Banana-UG-Kawashima (#3,11), Yasuharu Nakanishi (#7), Haruo Kubota (#10)
Composer: Yosui Inoue (All tracks except #5,6), Utsuru Ayame (#5), Kyohei Tsutsumi (#6), Natsumi Hirai (#7), Jun Sato (#8), Banana-UG-Kawashima (#11)
Lyricist: Yosui Inoue (All tracks except #9), Yasushi Akimoto (#9)
Mixing Engineer: Tamotsu Yoshida, Jun Tendo, Takayoshi Yamanouchi, Yuta Kagema
Recording Engineer: Jun Tendo, Junichi YAmazaki, Takayoshi Yamanouchi, Yuji Kuraishi, Kazuya Yoshida, Kazuya Miyazaki
Session Support Engineer: Kenji Igarashi, Yutaka Uematsu, Motoyoshi Komine, Junichi Hohrin, Yuko Suzuki, Hajime Nagai, Kenji Matsunaga, Kaoru Matsuyama
Mastering Engineer: Toru Kotetsu, Masayoshi Nakajo
Art/Styling: Sachico Ito
Photographer: Kenji Miura
Artwork producer: Noriko Shimoyama
Artwork designer:Shuzo Hayashi
Artwork supervisor: Tomio Watanabe
Artwork: Hiroshi Shoji
Promotion Staff: Mitsuo Sakauchi, Yasuhide Sasa
Production Coordinator: Sei Sato, Takashi Yokoo, Yasuko Makino, Chiharu Senoma
Production Manager: Nao Funatsu
Production Assistant: Hidenori Muto, Rie Nishioka, Satoko Ishizaki

Chart positions

Album

Singles

Release history

References

1993 albums
Yōsui Inoue albums